Stižu dolari is a Serbian comedy television series produced by Komuna Belgrade and the Radio Television of Serbia. It aired from 2004 to 2006.

The series was directed by Mihailo Vukobratovic and the script was written by Sinisa Pavic and Ljiljana Pavic. It starred Milenko Zablaćanski, Nela Mihajlovic, Aleksandar Berček and Dragan Jovanovic along with a large supporting cast.

References

External links
 

Serbian comedy television series
Television shows set in Belgrade
2006 Serbian television series endings
Television shows filmed in Belgrade
Radio Television of Serbia original programming